Håkan Jörgensen, author and freelance journalist, was born 1969 and grew up in Asmundtorp outside Landskrona, Sweden. In the 1990s he worked as a diving instructor in several countries. After studies at the Swedish School of Sport and Health Sciences and Stockholm University, he worked as an orthopedic technician to Gå & Löpkliniken for five years before he took the leap into journalism full-time after having freelanced for several years as a sideline.

Jörgensen writes mainly articles about health and travel for various media. He is the author of the following books:

 Säker dykning (Safe Diving)
 Gå Jogga Löp
 Hitta din balans (Finding Your Balance)
 Jämvikt och balans (Equilibrium and Balance)
 Ny succémetod
 Stretcha dig i form (Stretch Yourself Into Shape)
 Spa för kropp & själ (Spa for Body and Soul)

References

Sources

Swedish male writers
Swedish journalists
Stockholm University alumni
1969 births
Living people